Neoclassical metal is a subgenre of heavy metal that is heavily influenced by classical music and usually features very technical playing, consisting of elements borrowed from both classical and speed metal music. Deep Purple's Ritchie Blackmore and Jon Lord pioneered the subgenre by merging classical melodies and blues rock. Later, Yngwie Malmsteen became one of the most notable musicians in the subgenre, and contributed greatly to the development of the style in the 1980s. Other notable players in the genre are Randy Rhoads, John Petrucci, Michael Romeo, Jason Becker, Tony MacAlpine, Vinnie Moore, Uli Jon Roth, Stéphan Forté, Wolf Hoffmann, Timo Tolkki, and Marty Friedman.

Although the genre is mainly associated with guitarists (especially lead guitarists), keyboardists like Jens Johansson, Michael Pinnella, Alex Staropoli and Janne Wirman are also found playing in this style, with Jon Lord as an early influence on the genre.

Definition 
Neoclassical metal takes its name from a broad conception of classical music. In this it is a concept distinct from how neoclassicism is understood within the classical music tradition. Neoclassical music usually refers to a movement in musical modernism which developed roughly a century after the end of the Classical period and peaked during the years in between the two World Wars.

On the other hand, neoclassical metal music does not restrict itself to a return to classical aesthetic ideals, such as equilibrium and formalism. Its influences include both the Romantic musical period and the Baroque period of the seventeenth and first half of the eighteenth centuries. The music of late Baroque composers such as Vivaldi, Handel and Bach was often highly ornate. Neoclassical metal musicians such as Yngwie Malmsteen and Joshua Perahia are inspired by this aspect of Baroque music and also by later composers such as the violinist Niccolò Paganini in using runs and other decorative and showy techniques in their performances.
Neoclassical metal music thus looks to classical music as broadly understood by the general public and not to the more specialist technical definition used within classical circles.

History of the genre and influences 

In the 1960s and 1970s, there were many works that influenced this subgenre, Deep Purple's Concerto for Group and Orchestra being the most important one. Other bands, like Rainbow, also featured neoclassical influences. Early classical influences within hard rock and heavy metal are most notably found in the playing of Jon Lord, Keith Emerson, Ritchie Blackmore, Uli Jon Roth and Randy Rhoads. But it was in the 1980s when neoclassical metal became a distinct subgenre.

Heavy metal guitar technique developed rapidly from its late-1960s beginnings to its late-1980s peak, but before the 1980s, few metal guitarists displayed the advanced technical proficiency which is a hallmark of the neoclassical metal style. The popularization and growth of neoclassical metal is closely related to the ascension of the guitar "shredding" movement.

The "golden age" of neoclassical metal in the middle to late 1980s revolved around the sizeable roster of flashy electric-guitar soloists who recorded mostly instrumental albums for Mike Varney's Shrapnel Records label. Swedish guitarist Yngwie Malmsteen, widely regarded as the originator and still-reigning king of neoclassical metal, was brought to the United States by Varney to sign with Shrapnel Records in 1982.

Many subsequent Shrapnel artists, including Tony MacAlpine, Vinnie Moore, Joey Tafolla, Michael Angelo Batio, Paul Gilbert, David T. Chastain, Jason Becker, and Marty Friedman, emerged in the latter 1980s as exemplars of the neoclassical style.

In recent years, appreciation of the neoclassical metal oeuvre has been largely confined to guitarists in more of an underground setting, as the style is not well known beyond the realm of guitarists. Today, there are many more bands that contribute as a whole as opposed to the "solo" musicians in the past.

A common practice in the genre is to transcribe classical pieces and play them in a rock/metal band format or as a solo artist such as Tina Setkic. The Baroque and Classical periods have been particularly influential to the genre because of their unique sound and techniques that blend into a rock setting effectively.

Styles and theory 
A common feature of Neoclassical metal is the diminished seventh. It can be a useful tool for modulation, as it's possible to move by minor thirds through the chord, then use the diminished 7th as a leading tone to resolve to the tonic. Pentatonic scales are also prevalent (as in the vast majority of rock and metal styles).  A scale often used by neoclassical metal musicians is the harmonic minor scale, which is similar to the natural minor, but has a raised 7th (in the case of E, the D goes to D#).

Modes are also used on occasion.

See also 
 Classical music
 Cello rock
 Power metal
 Symphonic metal
 Progressive metal
 Shred guitar

References

Sources 

Heavy metal genres